The president of the Reichstag was the presiding officer of the German legislature from 1871 to 1918, under the German Empire and again from 1920 to 1945, under the Weimar Republic and Nazi Germany.

Presidents of the Reichstag

Presidium of the Reichstag

See also
Reichstag (German Empire)
Reichstag (Weimar Republic)
Reichstag (Nazi Germany)

Sources
German ministries 1871–1945Rulers.org

Reichstag (legislative body)
Political history of Germany
Germany